Dominik Bochenek (born 14 May 1987, in Jasło) is Polish athlete specializing in the high hurdles. He represented his country at four consecutive World Indoor Championships, as well as many continental level competitions.

His 110 metres hurdles personal best is 13.44 (2011) while his 60 metres hurdles best is 7.63 (2014).

Competition record

References

1987 births
Living people
People from Jasło
Polish male hurdlers
Sportspeople from Podkarpackie Voivodeship
Zawisza Bydgoszcz athletes
21st-century Polish people